USCGC Marlin is the fourth  coastal patrol boat. Her home port is Boston, Massachusetts.

In 2010 Marlin was assigned to help clean up oil from the Deepwater Horizon oil spill.

On November 3, 2015, the Marlin and  participated in the interception and repatriation of 85 individuals who tried to flee Cuba, by sea.

References

External links

Ships of the United States Coast Guard
Patrol vessels of the United States
Marine Protector-class coastal patrol boats
Marina del Rey, California
Ships built in Lockport, Louisiana